Copiapite is a hydrated iron sulfate mineral with formula:  Fe2+Fe3+4(SO4)6(OH)2·20(H2O).  Copiapite can also refer to a mineral group, the copiapite group.

Copiapite is strictly a secondary mineral forming from the weathering or oxidation of iron sulfide minerals or sulfide-rich coal. Its most common occurrence is as the end member mineral from the rapid oxidation of pyrite.  It also occurs rarely with fumaroles. It occurs with melanterite, alunogen, fibroferrite, halotrichite, botryogen, butlerite and amarantite.  It is by far the most common mineral in the copiapite group.

It rarely occurs as single crystals, is in the triclinic crystal system, and is pale to bright yellow.  It is soluble in water, changing the water color to deep orange or orangish-red.  In solution copiapite is very acidic. In high concentrations a negative pH can occur, as reported in waters draining from Richmond Mine at Iron Mountain, California.  Copiapite can easily be distinguished from native sulfur because it does not give off an odor when dissolved in water.  It can be distinguished from similar appearing uranium minerals, such as carnotite, by its lack of radioactivity.  The only way to differentiate between the minerals in the copiapite group is by X-ray diffraction.

Copiapite was first described in 1833 for an occurrence near Copiapó, Atacama, Chile. It is sometimes known as yellow copperas.  Other occurrences are in California, Nevada, and in the filled paleo sinkholes and caves of Missouri.

See also

 Classification of minerals
 List of minerals

References

Iron(II,III) minerals
Sulfate minerals
Triclinic minerals
Minerals in space group 2
Minerals described in 1833